Road to Kabul is a 2012 Moroccan action film directed by Brahim Chkiri.

With more than 400000 admissions, the film was a success at the box office.

Plot
Four friends in Casablanca dream of a better life in the Netherlands. When one of them has the opportunity to go, he arrives in Afghanistan instead.

Cast
Aziz Dadas as Ouchen
Said Bey as Ali
 as Masoud
 as Mbarek
 as Hmida
Alexandre Ottoveggio as Klurk

References

External links 

2012 action films